Giorgio Bambini (24 February 1945 – 13 November 2015) was an Italian heavyweight boxer who won a bronze medal at the 1968 Summer Olympics. After that he turned professional, and won all his 15 bouts in Italy before retiring in 1971.

References

Heavyweight boxers
Boxers at the 1968 Summer Olympics
Olympic boxers of Italy
Olympic bronze medalists for Italy
1945 births
2015 deaths
People from La Spezia
Olympic medalists in boxing
Italian male boxers
Medalists at the 1968 Summer Olympics
Mediterranean Games gold medalists for Italy
Competitors at the 1967 Mediterranean Games
Mediterranean Games medalists in boxing
Sportspeople from the Province of La Spezia